George Smith (born 8 October 1934) is a Jamaican cricketer. He played in three first-class matches for the Jamaican cricket team in 1956/57.

See also
 List of Jamaican representative cricketers

References

External links
 

1934 births
Living people
Jamaican cricketers
Jamaica cricketers
Cricketers from Kingston, Jamaica